Archbishop Leo (Makkonen) of Helsinki and All Finland, head of the Finnish Orthodox Church,  was born in Pielavesi in eastern Finland on June 4, 1948. After completing studies in 1972 at the Kuopio seminary, he was ordained deacon on 20 July 1973 and priest two days later.

He was consecrated Bishop of Joensuu on 25 February 1979, then served as Metropolitan of Oulu from 1980–1996. From 1996-2001 he served as Metropolitan of Helsinki, before taking up his post as Archbishop of Karelia; he was confirmed on 27 October 2001.

From 1979-1993 he served as chair of the Fellowship of Saints Sergius and Herman.

References

1948 births
Living people
Finnish Karelian people
People from Pielavesi
20th-century Eastern Orthodox bishops
21st-century Eastern Orthodox bishops
Eastern Orthodox Archbishops of Finland
Vicar bishops of the Finnish Orthodox Church
Finnish theologians